Episcope may refer to:

Opaque projector
Episcopal polity, within various Christian Churches and in ecumenical dialogue
Episcope, an indirect-vision device similar to a periscope, used in armoured fighting vehicles